The 2011 Baltimore Grand Prix was the first running of the Baltimore Grand Prix and the fifteenth round of the 2011 IndyCar Series season. It took place on Sunday, September 4, 2011. The race contested over 75 laps at the  Inner Harbor temporary street circuit in Baltimore, Maryland.

The race had originally been scheduled to take place on the first weekend of August, but was moved to Labor Day weekend to allow for better logistical and fan opportunities.

Will Power led 70 of 75 laps, on his way to score his last win of 2011. He shared the podium with Oriol Servià and Tony Kanaan, who finished third, after having started 27th.

As of 2022, it was the last race victory for Penske-Honda partnership in the series to date.

Results

Race

Notes
 Points include 1 point for pole position and 2 points for most laps led.

References

Baltimore Grand Prix
Baltimore Grand Prix
Baltimore Grand Prix
Baltimore Grand Prix
2010s in Baltimore